James Hardie Industries is a building materials company specializing in fiber cement siding. 

James Hardie may also refer to:
James Keir Hardie (1856–1915), founding member and first leader of the Labour Party in the United Kingdom
James Hardie (architect) (died 1889), American architect
James Allen Hardie (1823–1876), American soldier

See also
James Hardy (disambiguation)